Today's Empires, Tomorrow's Ashes is the third album by Canadian punk rock band Propagandhi, released February 6, 2001. It was released on the band's own G7 Welcoming Committee Records label in Canada and Fat Wreck Chords elsewhere. It is the first Propagandhi release of new material on their own label.

Background
Recording sessions were delayed due to various issues, one of which was the band's practice space being flooded, and another being that drummer Jord Samolesky broke his foot playing hockey. Prior to recording in May 2000, the band announced that it would have 14 songs, and would be titled Today's Empires, Tomorrow's Ashes. Samolesky broke his foot again in June 2000 while riding motocross; recording continued into August.

Composition
One of the album's tracks, "Back to the Motor League", indirectly refers to two songs by the Dead Kennedys, "Triumph of the Swill" and "Chickenshit Conformist", as well the year of their release on the 1986 album Bedtime for Democracy. The "Back to the Motor League" lyrics state: "fifteen years later it still reeks of swill and chickenshit conformists". Both the Dead Kennedys songs and the Propagandhi track concern the co-opting of punk ideology by the corporate record industry.

"Purina Hall of Fame" is a reference to the Nestlé owned pet food company, The Ralston Purina Company. The title is a cynical take on the Purina Animal Hall of Fame, a site that celebrates animals who have saved human lives. The lyrics of "Purina Hall of Fame" obliquely outline Propagandhi's concerns about animal cruelty.

Cover art
The album art is credited to the painting The Unfinished Flag of the United States by American poet Lawrence Ferlinghetti. Propagandhi continued this motif of using established artists to provide their cover artwork on their next two albums, Potemkin City Limits, using a piece by anarchist artist Eric Drooker, and Supporting Caste, which featured a painting entitled "The Triumph of Mischief" by Kent Monkman.

Release
After initially being planned for released in October 2000, and then delayed to November due to bassist/vocalist Todd Kowalski and guitarist/vocalist Chris Hannah both losing their voices. The album was again delayed to early 2001, with the label citing "something to do with hockey and ice-fishing." "Back to the Motor League"	was posted on G7 Welcoming Committee Records' website on November 10, 2000. Today's Empires, Tomorrow's Ashes was eventually released on February 6, 2001; G7 Welcoming Committee released it in Canada, and Fat Wreck Chords released it in the US. A release show was held at the University of Manitoba in Manitoba, Canada, on February 23, 2001. The band toured eastern Canada in April and May 2001, with Sixty Stories. In June and July, the band toured across Australia. In August and September, the band went on a tour of North America with Randy. Following the September 11 attacks, the remaining tour dates were cancelled.

Track listing

Personnel
Chris Hannah - guitar, vocals
Jord Samolesky - drums
Todd Kowalski - bass, vocals

References

External links
 Album information at the G7 Welcoming Committee Records website

2001 albums
Propagandhi albums
Fat Wreck Chords albums
G7 Welcoming Committee Records albums
Albums produced by Ryan Greene